Ivan Bitzi (born 4 August 1975) is a retired Swiss athlete specializing in the high hurdles events. His personal bests are 13.52 (2005) in 110 meters hurdles and 7.62 (2002) in 60 meters hurdles.

Competition record

References
IAAF profiles

1975 births
Living people
Swiss male hurdlers
World Athletics Championships athletes for Switzerland